Lee Do-hyung (born 15 October 2001) is a South Korean footballer who currently plays as a goalkeeper for FC Imabari.

Career statistics

Club
.

Notes

References

External links

2001 births
Living people
South Korean footballers
South Korean expatriate footballers
Association football goalkeepers
J3 League players
Jeonnam Dragons players
Suwon FC players
FC Imabari players
South Korean expatriate sportspeople in Japan
Expatriate footballers in Japan
Sportspeople from Daejeon